Fargas may refer to:
Fargas, Iran, a village in Markazi Province, Iran
Antonio Fargas (born 1946), American actor
Johneshwy Fargas (born 1994), Puerto Rican baseball player
Justin Fargas (born 1980), American football running back